Volatile fatty acids (VFAs) are important elements in controlling the anaerobic digestion process. It has two important roles: decomposing organics and generating gasses, methane and carbon dioxide. When both decomposing and generating occur continuously and completely, oxygen demand decreases. Volatile fatty acids can be analyzed by titration, distillation, steam distillation, and chromatography. The acceptable level of volatile fatty acids in environmental waters is up to 50,000 ppm.

Methods

Titration  
Titration provides rough results. However, it requires less time compared to other methods. It is widely used for a wastewater treatment plant to track a status of a microorganism.

Distillation 
The distillation procedure provides rough results and 15-32% of the VFAs are lost during distillation. This procedure is also used in for wastewater treatment plants.

Steam distillation 
Steam distillation could recover VFAs about 92-98%. It is more precise than previous two methods. However, it takes 4 hours to complete.

Chromatography  
Chromatography gives the most precise and accurate results. It is capable of qualitatively and quantitatively analyzing each individual VFA.

References 

Fatty acids
Anaerobic digestion